Handball Esch is a men's handball club from Esch, Luxembourg, that plays in the Luxembourgish Handball League. They were born in 2001 after the fusion between the two clubs from Esch, HB Eschois Fola and HC La Fraternelle Esch.

European record

Team

Current squad 
Squad for the 2016–17 season

Goalkeepers
 Cedric Busoni
 Louis Lieser 
 Rajko Milosevic 
 Ivan Pavlovic 

Wingers
RW
  Tom Krier 
  Dany Scholten
LW 
  Enes Agovic
  Samuel Baum
  Bruce Biren
  Elias Puissegur
Line players 
  Romain Labonte
  Sascha Marzadori
  Tom Quintus
  Luca Tomassini

Back players
LB
  Mario Jelinic 
  Max Kohl
  Julien Kohn
  Martin Muller
CB 
  Christian Bock
  Sacha Pulli 
  Vladimir Sarac 
RB
  Dimitri Mitrea
  Alexandros Vasilakis

References

External links
Official website 

Handball Esch